Ad astra (phrase) is a Latin phrase meaning "to the stars", and the motto of several organizations

Ad astra may also refer to:

General 
 Ad Astra (magazine), official publication of the National Space Society
 Ad Astra (journal), undergraduate journal of Roosevelt Academy
 Ad Astra (convention), Toronto literary science fiction convention
 "Ad Astra", a videogame released by Gargoyle Games in 1984.
 Ad Astra, science fiction play-by-mail game.

Companies 
 Ad Astra Rocket Company, a U.S. corporation founded by former NASA astronaut Franklin Chang-Diaz
 Ad Astra Aero, precursor of the now-defunct airline Swissair
 Ad Astra Games, a game publisher

Literature and art 
 "Ad Astra", a short story by William Faulkner 
 "Ad Astra", a short story by Harry Harrison
 Ad Astra, a painting by Akseli Gallen-Kallela
 Ad Astra (Lippold sculpture), a large sculpture at the entrance to the National Air and Space Museum

Film
 Ad Astra (film), a 2019 American science fiction thriller film

Music 
 "Ad Astra", a song by the band Deerhunter, from the album Fading Frontier
 "Ad Astra", a song by the band Arcturus, from the album La Masquerade Infernale
 "All the Works of Nature Which Adorn the World - Ad Astra", a song by the band Nightwish, from the album Human. :II: Nature.
 Ad Astra, an album and a song by the band Spiritual Beggars

See also
 Adastra (disambiguation)
 Per aspera ad astra, a related Latin phrase
 Per ardua ad astra, another similar Latin phrase